Norman Foster (birth registered fourth ¼ 1907 – February 1999) was an English professional rugby league footballer who played in the 1920s, 1930s and 1940s, and coached in the 1940s and 1950s.

Playing career

International honours 
Norman Foster won a cap for England while at Keighley in 1935 against France.

County honours 
Norman Foster won cap(s) for Yorkshire while at Keighley.

Club career 
Norman Foster made his début for Keighley against Featherstone Rovers at Post Office Road during the 1928-29 season on Tuesday 2 April 1929, and he was transferred from Keighley to Halifax in 1935 for £1,600 (based on increases in average earnings, this would be approximately £279,700 in 2016).

Testimonial match 
Norman Foster's Testimonial match at Keighley took place during the 1945–46 season.

Honoured at Keighley Cougars 
Norman Foster is a Keighley Cougars Hall of Fame inductee, inducted in November 1998.

Genealogical information 
Norman Foster's marriage to Hilda (née Gordon, birth registered fourth ¼ 1906 in Keighley) was registered second ¼ 1929 in Keighley district.

Funeral 
Norman Foster funeral took place at 1.45pm on Tuesday 16 February 1999 at St Mary's Church, Riddlesden.

References

External links 
 Keighley Hall of Fame
 (archived by web.archive.org) Good health, Keighley Cougars - Rugby League Express - November 1998
Norman Foster at keighleyrugbyleagueheritage.co.uk

1907 births
1999 deaths
England national rugby league team players
English rugby league coaches
English rugby league players
Halifax R.L.F.C. players
Hull Kingston Rovers players
Keighley Cougars players
Newcastle RLFC players
People from Settle, North Yorkshire
Place of death missing
Rugby league centres
Rugby league players from Keighley
Yorkshire rugby league team players